Capo dell'Armi Lighthouse is an active lighthouse in Reggio Calabria, southern Italy. Located along the cliffs of the headland, in the comune of Motta San Giovanni, it is an important reference for ships coming into the Strait of Sicily from the south.

Description
The tower is painted white and the lantern dome in grey metallic.

The lighthouse is completely automated and managed by the Marina Militare with the identification code number 3380 E.F.

See also
 List of lighthouses in Italy

References

External links

 Servizio Fari Marina Militare 

Lighthouses in Italy
Buildings and structures in Reggio Calabria
Lighthouses completed in 1867
1867 establishments in Italy